The Adams House in Carson City, Nevada, located at 990 N. Minnesota St., is a historic Bungalow/Craftsman-style house that was built during 1922-23 by DeWitt Adams, for his family.  It is a "modest" building but a good example of a small bungalow with American Craftsman architecture.  Its design is believed to have been a catalog plan.
It was listed on the National Register of Historic Places in 1999.

The property was listed for sale, marketed for use as offices, in 2013.

References 

Houses on the National Register of Historic Places in Nevada
Houses completed in 1923
Bungalow architecture in Nevada
American Craftsman architecture in Nevada
National Register of Historic Places in Carson City, Nevada
Houses in Carson City, Nevada